O is the second extended play by South Korean singer Yuju. It was released by Konnect Entertainment on March 7, 2023, and contains five tracks, including the lead single "Without U".

Background and release
On February 14, 2023, Konnect Entertainment announced Yuju would be releasing her second extended play titled O on March 7, the promotional schedule was also released on the same day. On February 16, the mood teaser video was released. On February 27, the track listing was released with "Without U" announced as the lead single. On March 1, the highlight medley video was released. Two days later, the music video teaser for lead single "Without U" was released.

Track listing

Charts

Release history

References

2023 EPs
Korean-language EPs
Konnect Entertainment EPs